Luis Engel (born 14 October 2002 in Hamburg) is a German chess grandmaster (since 2020).

He scored 8/9 on Germany's second team at the 2016 World Youth Chess Olympiad, claiming the top prize on the 2nd board.

At the German championships:

 2012: U10 4th place
 2013: U12 7th place
 2014: U12 1st place, German champion
 2015: U14 4th place
 2016: U14 1st place, German champion
 2017: U16 4th place
 2019: U18 1st place, European team champion
 2020: 1st place, German champion
 2021: 1st place, German masters
Engel received the International Master title in 2018.

References

External links
 

2002 births
Living people
German chess players
Chess grandmasters